Conrad Wise Chapman (February 14, 1842 – December 10, 1910) was an American painter who served in the Confederate States Army from 1861 to 1865.

Early life 
Conrad Wise Chapman was born in Washington, D.C. and grew up in Europe where his father, John Gadsby Chapman, was working as an artist.

Career 
In 1861, Chapman returned to America and enlisted in Company D, Third Kentucky Infantry, Confederate. He was wounded in Shiloh along with seeing action in Mississippi and Louisiana, before a transfer to the 46th Virginia Infantry at the request of his father to Henry Alexander Wise. Over the next 10 months, he also served with the 59th Virginia Infantry, known as the Wise Legion or Wise Brigade, with both the 46th and 59th at Chaffin's Farm on the James River in Henrico County.

In September 1863, the Wise Brigade was ordered south to take part in the defence of Charleston, South Carolina. Chapman was commissioned to create thirty one paintings of the city's defenses by Brig. Gen. Thomas Jordan, chief of staff to commanding Gen. P. G. T. Beauregard. This was part of a campaign by Beauregard to increase support for his ideas about the defense of the harbor in the Confederate government. Chapman served in the city from early September 1863 to March 1864. He intended to paint the entire series in Charleston, but having received word of his mother's illness, Chapman was granted furlough in April 1864 and left for Rome, Italy to visit his family. It is there that he painted 25 works—with five also done by his father—from sketches he made in Charleston.

Chapman created art while he was on active duty during the war. While there were several artists on the Union side who captured the war in painting, who were also active, this was not the case on the Confederate side. His works may be the only set of battle subjects painted by a Confederate artist during the war.

After the end of the American Civil War, unable to reconcile to the Confederacy's loss, Chapman traveled to Mexico where he painted a series of views of the Valley of Mexico. He also spent time in France and England. In 1898, his entire collection of paintings went on view at the Union League Club in New York, where they attracted attention, but no buyers. He then moved his family to Richmond where the following year he sold 31 paintings to then Confederate Memorial Literary Society, which later became the Museum of the Confederacy and is now the American Civil War Museum.

Gallery

References

Footnotes

Further reading 
 Chapman, Conrad Wise, and Ben L. Bassham. Ten Months in the "Orphan Brigade": Conrad Wise Chapman's Civil War Memoir. Kent, Ohio: Kent State University Press, 1999.   
 Chapman, Conrad Wise, Ben L. Bassham, and Ruben Charles Cordova. Conrad Wise Chapman: Mexican light, 1865-1910. Nueva York: Galería Ramis Barquet, 2005. 
 Stevenson, Lauralee Trent. Confederate Soldier Artists: Painting the South's War. Shippensburg, PA: White Mane Pub, 1998.

External links 

 
 

19th-century American painters
19th-century American male artists
19th-century war artists
20th-century American painters
1842 births
1910 deaths
American expatriates in Mexico
American male painters
American war artists
Confederate States Army soldiers
Painters from Washington, D.C.
People of Virginia in the American Civil War
20th-century American male artists